"Someday Baby" is a Grammy Award-winning blues song written and performed by American singer-songwriter Bob Dylan, released as the fifth track on his 2006 album Modern Times. The song had considerable success, garnering more airtime on U.S. radio than any other track on the album. It spent twenty weeks on Billboard's Adult Alternative Songs chart, peaking at #3 in November 2006. It was also anthologized on the compilation album Dylan in 2007. 

Like much of Dylan's 21st century output, he produced the song himself under the pseudonym Jack Frost.

Composition and recording
The song is based on "Trouble No More," a folk/blues song written by Muddy Waters and popularized by the Allman Brothers Band, which was in turn based on "Someday Baby Blues" by Sleepy John Estes and popularized by Big Maceo as "Worried Life Blues". In their book Bob Dylan All the Songs: The Story Behind Every Track, authors Philippe Margotin and Jean-Michel Guesdon note that although Dylan "may have kept the structure, he changed the lyrics. The story spins around the marital problems of a poor fellow, but is punctuated with lines of the purest Dylan style". The song is performed in the key of B-flat major.

Use in commercial

The song was featured in a prominent iPod + iTunes commercial that appeared around the time Modern Times was released in early September 2006. In the commercial, shots of a silhouetted Dylan performing "Someday Baby" on acoustic guitar and singing into an antique microphone are juxtaposed with shots of the silhouette of a woman dancing. Writing in Wired magazine, Andy Cush summed up the ad by stating, "Taking advantage of Mr. Zimmerman's nearly pan-cultural appeal, Apple was able to attract cool dads and their college student kids with this single statement".

Other versions
An alternate version of the song, from the same Modern Times recording sessions, featuring a slower tempo and different arrangement and lyrics, appeared on the 2008 Dylan compilation The Bootleg Series Vol. 8 – Tell Tale Signs: Rare and Unreleased 1989–2006. This version of the song was number 37 on Rolling Stones list of the 100 Best Songs of 2008 and Dylan biographer Howard Sounes called it "more engaging" than the official album version. Engineer Chris Shaw, in an interview with Uncut, discussed the differences between the two versions:

Notable covers
The song was covered by Canadian singer/songwriter Leslie Feist live during her 2009 tour.

Chart performance

Awards
 Grammy Award for Best Solo Rock Vocal Performance (2007)

References

External links
Lyrics at Bob Dylan's official site
iPod commercial featuring "Someday Baby" on YouTube

Songs written by Bob Dylan
Bob Dylan songs
2006 songs
Grammy Award for Best Solo Rock Vocal Performance
Song recordings produced by Bob Dylan
Columbia Records singles